Lee Harmon (born 20 October 1967) is a football executive from Cook Islands.

Since 1997, Lee Harmon has been the president of the Cook Islands Football Association (CIFA). He was last re-elected in April 2016. Furthermore, he has been a member of the FIFA Council since September 2016.

On the 7th of March 2019, Lee Harmon was suspended by FIFA's ethics committee for the resale of World Cup tickets. Lee Harmon received a fine of £15,000 with his three-month suspension from taking part in any football activity at national or international level.

In August 2021 he was banned by the OFC Disciplinary and Ethics Committee for six years because he breached the OFC Code of Ethics. The Confederacy did not release any further information about the case.

References 

1968 births
Living people
FIFA officials